The 2006 California Secretary of State election occurred on 7 November 2006. The primary elections took place on 6 June 2006. Despite Arnold Schwarzenegger’s 17-point re-election as Governor, State Senator Debra Bowen, the Democratic nominee, narrowly defeated the incumbent, Republican Bruce McPherson.

Primary results
A bar graph of statewide results in this contest are available here.

Results by county are available here and here.

Democratic

Candidates 

 Debra Bowen, State Senator
 Deborah Ortiz, State Senator

Others

Results

Results by county
Results from the Secretary of State of California:

See also
California state elections, 1974
State of California
Secretary of State of California

References

External links
VoteCircle.com Non-partisan resources & vote sharing network for Californians
Information on the elections from California's Secretary of State 
Official Homepage of the Secretary of State of California

2006 California elections
California Secretary of State elections
California
November 2006 events in the United States